Light House is a railway station on the Chennai MRTS. It is located behind the Queen Mary's college, between Avvai Shanmugam Salai in Triplicane and Radha Krishnan Salai at Mylapore. It is the MRTS station for the famous Chennai Lighthouse.

History
Light House station was opened on 19 October 1997, as part of the first phase of the Chennai MRTS network.

Structure
The station is elevated and built on the eastern banks of the Buckingham Canal. The Station building consists of 1010 sq.m of parking area in its basement, which is largely unused.

Service and connections
Light House station is the seventh station on the MRTS line to Velachery. In the return direction from Velachery, it is currently the eleventh station towards Chennai Beach station.

See also
 Chennai MRTS
 Chennai suburban railway
 Chennai Metro
 Transport in Chennai

References

Chennai Mass Rapid Transit System stations
Railway stations in Chennai
Railway stations opened in 1997